Robert Kelly (16 November 1893 – 22 September 1969) was an English professional footballer. He broke the British football transfer record when he moved from Burnley to Sunderland for £6,550 in 1925. He spent two years at the Roker Park club before joining Huddersfield Town. He later played for Preston North End.

He made 14 appearances for England between 1920 and 1928, scoring eight goals.

He also had spells as manager at Carlisle United, Stockport County, SC Heerenveen and KFC.

References

External links
Sunderland career details
England profile

1893 births
1969 deaths
People from Ashton-in-Makerfield
English footballers
Association football inside forwards
English Football League players
England international footballers
Burnley F.C. players
Sunderland A.F.C. players
Huddersfield Town A.F.C. players
Preston North End F.C. players
Carlisle United F.C. players
English football managers
Carlisle United F.C. managers
Stockport County F.C. managers
Sporting CP managers
FC St. Gallen managers
SC Heerenveen managers
Barry Town United F.C. managers
English Football League managers
Burnley F.C. wartime guest players
Expatriate football managers in the Netherlands
Expatriate football managers in Portugal
Expatriate football managers in Switzerland
English expatriate sportspeople in the Netherlands
English expatriate sportspeople in Portugal
English expatriate sportspeople in Switzerland
English Football League representative players
FA Cup Final players